Jœuf is a commune in the Meurthe-et-Moselle department in north-eastern France.

Population

People
It is the birthplace of:
Michel Platini, football player
Éric Occansey, basketball player

See also
Communes of the Meurthe-et-Moselle department

References

External links

 Official website 

Joeuf